The Chari Formation is a Jurassic (Callovian to Oxfordian) geologic formation in Gujarat, western India. Dinosaur remains are among the fossils that have been recovered from the formation, although none have yet been referred to a specific genus. The ammonite Reineckeia has also been found here.

See also 
 List of dinosaur-bearing rock formations
 List of stratigraphic units with indeterminate dinosaur fossils

References

Bibliography

Further reading 
 R. Dutta and S. Bardhan. 2016. Systematics, endemism and phylogeny of Indian proplanulitins (Ammonoidea) from the Bathonian–Callovian of Kutch, western India. Swiss Journal of Paleontology 135:23-56
 M. Alberti, D. K. Pandey, and F. T. Fürsich. 2011. Ammonites of the genus Peltoceratoides Spath, 1924 from the Oxfordian of Kachchh, western India. Neues Jahrbuch für Geologie und Paläontologie, Abhandlungen 262:1-18
 S. S. Das, S. Bardhan, and T. Kase. 2005. A new pleurotomariid gastropod assemblage from the Jurassic sequence of Kutch, western India. Paleontological Research 9(4):329-346
 F. T. Fürsich, D. K. Pandey, W. Oschmann, A.K. Jaitly, and I.B. Singh. 1994. Ecology and adaptive strategies of corals in unfavourable environments: Examples from the Middle Jurassic of the Kachchh Basin, western India. Neues Jahrbuch für Geologie und Paläontologie, Abhandlungen 194(2-3):269-303
 D. N. Ghosh. 1990. Biometry of two species of Kallirhynchia (Buckman) from Callovian beds of Kutch, India. Brachiopods Through Time 97-100

Geologic formations of India
Jurassic System of Asia
Jurassic India
Callovian Stage
Oxfordian Stage
Limestone formations
Siltstone formations
Sandstone formations
Shallow marine deposits
Paleontology in India
Formations